The 2011 L&H 500 was the ninth event of the 2011 International V8 Supercars Championship. It was held on the weekend of 16 to 18 September at the Phillip Island Grand Prix Circuit in Victoria, Australia.  This was the eleventh running of the Phillip Island 500, the fourth occasion in which it filled the role of the annual 500 kilometre, two-driver V8 Supercar race, and the 21st ATCC championship race meeting at the circuit. It was also the last 500 kilometre race for V8 Supercars at Phillip Island, as the endurance race returned to Sandown Raceway in 2012, and the Phillip Island event reverted to a sprint race format with two 150 kilometre races.

Unique to the L&H 500, two preliminary 14 lap qualifying races were held on Saturday with the two drivers of each car starting one race each. A single pitstop by each car in either race, in which at least two tyres were changed, was mandated, with the combined results of the two qualifying races determining the grid for the main 500 kilometre race. The 500 kilometre race itself was Race 19 of the championship.

Tony D'Alberto Racing driver Tony D'Alberto was forced to withdraw from the race after contracting chicken pox. He was replaced by Fujitsu Series driver Taz Douglas.

Ford Performance Racing's Will Davison and Luke Youlden came out best of the qualifying format, and secured pole position for the main race, with the 2010 L&H 500 winners Craig Lowndes and Mark Skaife lining up sixth.

The TeamVodafone pairing of Craig Lowndes and Mark Skaife came through the 500 km race to secure the consecutive victories at the event, followed by Jamie Whincup and Andrew Thompson, with pole-sitters Will Davison and Luke Youlden crossing the line third.

Results

L&H 500
Results of the 500 kilometre Race 19 were as follows:

Standings
 Championship standings after 19 of 28 races were as follows.

References

External links
Official L & H 500 website
Official series website

L and H 500
Motorsport at Phillip Island
Phillip Island 500
Pre-Bathurst 500